Willard Donald James is an American mathematician most known for his work on the James-Stein estimator. He graduated with a Ph.D. in mathematics from University of Illinois in 1957 and was recruited to California State University, Long Beach in 1967 from which he retired as a Professor Emeritus in 1987.

References 

Living people
20th-century American mathematicians
21st-century American mathematicians
University of Illinois alumni
California State University, Long Beach faculty
Year of birth missing (living people)